The traditional clothing of Hyderabad, India has both Muslim and South Asian influences. Men wear sherwani and kurta–paijama and women wear khara dupatta and salwar kameez.

Most Muslim women wear burqa and hijab outdoors. Western-style clothing is increasingly common among younger people.

Men's wear

 Sherwani
 Kurta–paijama / Churidar
 Lungi

Women's wear
 Sarees
 Langa voni
 Gaagra Choli
 Khara dupatta
 Shalwar kameez

References

Culture of Hyderabad, India
Hyderabad